Graderia is a genus of plants in the family Orobanchaceae, which is native to Africa and Socotra. It belongs to the tribe Buchnereae. It is a hemiparasitic taxon.

Etymology
Graderia is a taxonomic anagram derived from the name of the confamilial genus Gerardia. The latter name is a taxonomic patronym honoring the English botanist John Gerard.

Description

Sometimes a suffrutex with stems growing from a woody rhizome. Leaves may be opposite or alternate. The solitary flowers appear in the axils, and have a five-lobed calyx and corolla. The flower is tubular with four stamens, in pairs of unequal length. Each stamen has two divergent, oblong and curved thecae. The two-locular ovary has numerous ovules, and produces numerous seeds in a fruit capsule.

Systematics
The genus includes some 4 species.
 Graderia fruticosa Balf.f. is endemic to Socotra.
 Graderia linearifolia Codd
 Graderia scabra Benth.
 Graderia subintegra Mast.

References

Orobanchaceae
Orobanchaceae genera
Taxonomy articles created by Polbot